Victor Vlad Cornea and Petros Tsitsipas were the defending champions but only Cornea chose to defend his title, partnering Andrew Paulson. They went on to win the title, defeating Adrian Andreev and Murkel Dellien 6–3, 6–1 in the final.

Seeds

Draw

References

External links
 Main draw

IBG Prague Open - Doubles